In association football, the Belgian Golden Shoe is an award given in Belgium at the beginning of each civil year to the best footballer of the Belgian First Division A for the past year. The trophy is sponsored by the Belgian newspaper Het Laatste Nieuws.

The voters are a selection of Belgian press specialists and football personalities.  They are invited to vote for the best player of the competition for both half seasons (previous season second half and current season first half) and each get to submit a top three, scoring 3, 2 and 1 point respectively. As a result, a player can receive all of his votes in one half season (e.g. if he joined the championship from abroad during summer), or he can receive votes for matches with two (or more) different teams, as with Philippe Albert in 1992 and Mbark Boussoufa in 2006.

Paul Van Himst has collected 4 Belgian Golden Shoes which is the current record. Jan Ceulemans and Wilfried Van Moer have both won the trophy three times. The first foreigner to win the trophy was the Dutchman Johan Boskamp, especially for his excellence during the second half of the 1974–75 season, when his club, RWDM (currently defunct), won its first and only championship title. The only foreigners who have won the award more than once are the Swede Pär Zetterberg and the Moroccan Mbark Boussoufa. In 2011, Argentinian Matías Suárez became the first South American to be awarded the Golden Shoe.

From 2000, an award was also given to the best Belgian footballer abroad, although this award was not handed out in certain years, specifically from 2003 to 2007 and 2010 to 2011. Since 2013, the best coach, best goalkeeper, and best youngster awards have also been handed out. Finally, in 2016, Tessa Wullaert was awarded the first-ever Golden Shoe for women football players. Contrary to the men's award which is awarded to the best player in Belgium, the women's award goes to the best Belgian footballer, playing either in Belgium or abroad.

Men

Golden Shoe

Breakdown of winners

Multiple winners

By nationality

Secondary awards

Women 
While the men's golden shoe award goes to the best player in the Belgian league, irrespective of his nationality, the women's award is targeted at the best Belgian female player, either in Belgium or abroad.

References 
 Golden Shoe – Royal Belgian Football Association
 Belgium - Player of the Year Awards – Rec.Sport.Soccer Statistics Foundation

Golden Shoe
Awards established in 1954
1954 establishments in Belgium
Annual events in Belgium